Welaka is a town situated on the St. Johns River in Putnam County, Florida, United States. The population was 701 as of the 2010 census.  According to the U.S. Census Bureau's 2018 estimates, the town had a population of 712. The town is part of the Palatka Micropolitan Statistical Area.

History

It is not known when the area was first settled, but the nearby Mount Royal archaeological site is a possible remnant of a Timucua Indian village from c. 1250 CE to 1500 CE, and may have a connection to the town of Enacape, an important center of the Utina tribe.

The settlement was originally a 500-acre tract purchased by James William Bryant in 1852 and was known as Mt. Tucker. Prior to the war, there were large orange groves and cotton plantations. In 1860, Welaka's population was slightly over 100. At the end of the Civil War, fewer than 20 remained. The town grew again and was incorporated on April 23, 1887, and Welaka was affirmed as the town's name; the name Welaka is said to have been derived from the word local American Indians used for the St. Johns River. By the 1880s, Welaka had become a resort town, marketing itself to visitors seeking medicinal cures from the mineral water of the local springs. The Welaka Mineral Water Company was incorporated in 1907.

Geography

Welaka is approximately 90 miles south of Jacksonville and is accessible by highway or the Atlantic Ocean via the St. Johns River. It is located at  (29.481556, –81.671555).

Demographics

As of the census of 2000, there were 586 people, 276 households, and 173 families residing in the town. The racial makeup of the town was 67.06% White, 28.84% African American, 0.34% Native American, 0.17% Pacific Islander, 2.22% from other races, and 1.37% from two or more races. Hispanic or Latino of any race were 3.41% of the population.

There were 276 households, out of which 16.7% had children under the age of 18 living with them, 47.5% were married couples living together, 12.7% had a female householder with no husband present, and 37.3% were non-families. 31.9% of all households were made up of individuals, and 17.8% had someone living alone who was 65 years of age or older.  The average household size was 2.12 and the average family size was 2.63.

In the town, the population was spread out, with 17.2% under the age of 18, 5.5% from 18 to 24, 19.6% from 25 to 44, 30.2% from 45 to 64, and 27.5% who were 65 years of age or older.  The median age was 52 years. For every 100 females, there were 86.6 males.  For every 100 females age 18 and over, there were 84.4 males.

The median income for a household in the town was $25,069, and the median income for a family was $30,938. Males had a median income of $29,583 versus $20,938 for females. The per capita income for the town was $14,495.  About 15.8% of families and 25.0% of the population were below the poverty line, including 38.2% of those under age 18 and 11.1% of those age 65 or over.

Politics
Welaka has a Strong Mayor–council government where Two Council members are elected in even-number years, and the Mayor and two Town Council members are elected in odd-numbered years.
The present Mayor is Jamie D. Watts, who assumed office on March 5, 2021, as the 37th Mayor of the Town of Welaka. 

Jamie Watts is an American author, politician, and small business owner. Before serving as Mayor, Jamie served on the Welaka Town Council from March 2008 through March 2021, when he was elected Mayor of the Town. 

His responsibilities as Strong Mayor include acting as the Town Manager, Utility Director, Finance Director, and Police Commissioner. He also oversees the Building Department, Codes and Zoning, and Public Works. He was re-elected unopposed for a second term as Mayor on January 20, 2023.

Points of interest

 Welaka National Fish Hatchery
 Mount Royal
 Welaka State Forest

External links

References

4. https://www.welaka-fl.gov/about-welaka/pages/mayor-jamie-watts

Towns in Putnam County, Florida
Towns in Florida
Populated places on the St. Johns River